TPG Telecom Limited, formerly Vodafone Hutchison Australia and renamed following the merger with TPG, is an Australian telecommunications company. It is the second largest telecommunications company listed on the Australian Securities Exchange. TPG Telecom is the third-largest wireless carrier in Australia, with 5.8 million subscribers as of 2020.

TPG Telecom is home to brands in Australia including Vodafone, TPG, iiNet, AAPT, Internode, Lebara and felix. TPG Telecom owns and operates nationwide fixed and mobile network infrastructure, including Australia’s second-largest fixed voice and data network, with more than 27,000 kilometres of metropolitan and inter-capital fibre and a mobile network comprising more than 5,600 sites and covering over 23 million Australians.

History 
TPG Telecom was previously known as Vodafone Hutchison Australia (VHA). VHA was majority owned by Hutchison Telecommunications (Australia), a listed company of CK Hutchison Holdings group and Vodafone. Vodafone Hutchison Australia was formed by a merger of Vodafone Australia and Hutchison Australia's 3 in 2009. VHA started to phase out the 3 brand in 2011.

On 30 June 2020, VHA received a listing on the Australian Securities Exchange. The newly listed company then merged with TPG Corporation, previously known as TPG Telecom on 13 July 2020. 

In August 2018, VHA and TPG announced their intention to merge. Initially rejected by the Australian Competition & Consumer Commission, the plan was given permission to proceed via a February 2020 Federal Court of Australia ruling. 

TPG Telecom has 27,000+-kilometre inter-capital and metropolitan fibre network and is also the second-largest data and fixed-voice network in Australia. It has an international system of connecting subsea cables to major hubs in Asia and North America from Australia. It also has a strong 4G network covering more than 23 million customers in over 5,600 sites. Additionally, a 5G network roll-out is currently underway.

Merger announcement 
A merger of TPG and Vodafone Hutchison Australia was officially announced on 30 August 2018.

Network Sharing Proposal 
On 21 February 2022, TPG Telecom announced a proposed network sharing (MOCN) deal with Telstra, which would see TPG gain access to approximately 3,700 Telstra mobile base stations in regional Australia, and Telstra being authorised to use TPG's mobile spectrum in these regional areas. Under the deal, pending approval by the ACCC, 725 of TPG's mobile sites would be decommissioned, and another 169 of their sites would be used to deploy Telstra infrastructure. The deal is described as being mutually beneficial for both TPG, who would see an increase in mobile coverage area, and Telstra, who would gain access to more spectrum to relieve congestion on their network. The deal has been strongly opposed by their market competitor Optus, who argue that the approval of the deal would cement Telstra's position as the monopoly mobile operator in regional areas, stifle competition, and increase prices.

Brands 
Several internet and mobile brands are operated by TPG Telecom including TPG, Vodafone, iiNet, Internode, AAPT, Lebara and felix.

References

External links 
 

Vodafone
CK Hutchison Holdings
Mobile phone companies of Australia
Internet service providers of Australia
Companies based in Sydney
Australian subsidiaries of foreign companies
Companies listed on the Australian Securities Exchange